Camille Anise Noel (born 14 April 1974) is a Canadian sprinter who specialized in the 400 metres.

As a junior she competed without finishing at the 1990 World Junior Championships and finished fourth at the 1992 World Junior Championships. In the relay she finished seventh in the 4 × 400 metres relay and competed in the 4 × 100 metres relay, both at the 1992 World Junior Championships.

In the same year she finished fourth in the women's 4 × 400 metres relay at the 1992 Summer Olympics. At the 1993 World Championships she competed without reaching the final in the 400 metres and in the 4 × 100 metres relay.

References

External links
 

1974 births
Living people
Athletes (track and field) at the 1991 Pan American Games
Athletes (track and field) at the 1992 Summer Olympics
Canadian female sprinters
Olympic track and field athletes of Canada
Athletes from Vancouver
World Athletics Championships athletes for Canada
UCLA Bruins women's track and field athletes
Pan American Games track and field athletes for Canada